Vadim Nikolayevich Rogovskoy (born 6 February 1962) is a retired Russian professional footballer.

Honours
 Soviet Top League bronze: 1988, 1991.
 Soviet Cup finalist: 1988, 1989, 1991.

European club competitions
 UEFA Cup 1988–89 with FC Torpedo Moscow: 2 games.
 European Cup Winners' Cup 1989–90 with FC Torpedo Moscow: 3 games.
 UEFA Cup 1990–91 with FC Torpedo Moscow: 7 games.
 UEFA Cup 1995–96 with Zagłębie Lubin: 3 games.

External links
 

1962 births
Living people
Soviet footballers
Russian footballers
Soviet Union under-21 international footballers
Russian expatriate footballers
Expatriate footballers in Poland
Soviet Top League players
Ekstraklasa players
FC Torpedo Moscow players
Zagłębie Lubin players
GKS Bełchatów players
Russian expatriate sportspeople in Poland
Association football defenders
FC Avangard Kursk players
FC Iskra Smolensk players
FC Lida players
Omega Kleszczów players